Burraboi is a community in New South Wales, Australia.

Burraboi Post Office opened on 1 July 1929 and closed in 1942 (a telephone office remained open until 1957).

Burraboi Public School first began construction in 1954, however in 2010 the school merged with Wakool Public School to create the Wakool Burraboi Public School.

The largest rice silo complex in the southern hemisphere is located at Burraboi.

References

External links

Towns in the Riverina
Towns in New South Wales
Murray River Council